Count Alajos Károlyi de Nagykároly (8 August 18252 December 1889) was an Austro-Hungarian diplomat.

Biography
He was born in Vienna, into the Hungarian noble family of Károlyi, whose fame dates from the time of Sándor Károlyi (1668–1743), one of the generals of Francis II Rákóczi, who in 1711 negotiated the peace of Szatmár between the insurgent Hungarians and the new king, the emperor Charles VI, was made a count of the Empire in 1712, and subsequently became a field marshal in the imperial army.

Alajos Károlyi entered the Austrian diplomatic service at the age of 19, and in 1845 became an attaché to the Berlin embassy. He was assigned successively to Austrian embassies at various European capitals; from 1853 at the diplomatic mission in London. In 1858 he was sent to Saint Petersburg on a special mission to seek the support of Russia in the threatening Franco-Austrian War against Napoleon III.

Károlyi was appointed ambassador at Berlin in 1866 at the time of the rupture between Prussia and Austria, and after the Seven Weeks War was responsible for the negotiation of the preliminaries of peace at Nikolsburg. He was again sent to Berlin in 1871, acted as second plenipotentiary at the Berlin congress of 1878, and was sent in the same year to London, where he represented Austria for ten years. He died in Tótmegyer, which is now in Slovakia.

References

Alajos Karolyi
1825 births
1889 deaths
Diplomats from Vienna
Austro-Hungarian diplomats
Knights of the Golden Fleece of Austria